Chubar Rural District is a rural district (dehestan) in Ahmadsargurab District, Shaft County, Gilan Province, Iran. At the 2006 census, its population was 12,845, in 3,417 families. The rural district has 33 villages.

References 

Rural Districts of Gilan Province
Shaft County